John Walter (8 October 1818 – 3 November 1894) was an English newspaper publisher and Liberal politician who sat in the House of Commons variously between 1847 and 1885.

Walter was born at Printing-house Square, the eldest son of John Walter, editor of The Times. He was educated at Eton and Exeter College, Oxford, being called to the bar in 1847. On leaving Oxford he took part in the business management of The Times, and on his father's death became sole manager, delegating some of his work to Mowbray Morris. He was a man of scholarly tastes and serious religious views, and his conscientious character had a marked influence on the tone of the paper. It was under him that the successive improvements in the printing machinery, begun by his father in 1814, at last reached the stage of the "Walter Press" in 1869, the pioneer of modern newspaper printing-presses.

In 1847 Walter was elected to Parliament for Nottingham as a moderate Liberal, and was re-elected in 1852 and in 1857. In 1859 he was returned for Berkshire, where he lived at Bearwood House in Sindlesham.  John Walter built a model village arranged around a green at Sindlesham, whose buildings included a "typically solid Victorian building" which housed a pub and still bears the family name today, as the Walter Arms.

Though defeated in 1865, John Walter III was again elected to Parliament for Berkshire in 1868, and held the seat until he retired in 1885.

Walter was twice married, first in 1842 to Emily Frances Court (d. 1858), and then in 1861 to Flora Macnabb. His eldest son by his first marriage, John, was accidentally drowned at Bearwood on Christmas Eve in 1870, while trying to rescue his brother and cousin.

Walter was succeeded by Arthur Fraser Walter (1846–1910), his second son by his first marriage. A.F. Walter remained chief proprietor of The Times until 1908, when it was converted into a company. He then became chairman of the board of directors, and on his death was succeeded in this position by his son John.

References

External links

Stuart A. Rose Manuscript, Archives, and Rare Book Library, Emory University: John Walter papers, 1895-1956. (John Walter IV)

1818 births
1894 deaths
Alumni of Exeter College, Oxford
Members of the Parliament of the United Kingdom for Berkshire
19th-century British newspaper publishers (people)
People educated at Eton College
People from Winnersh
Walter family
UK MPs 1847–1852
UK MPs 1852–1857
UK MPs 1857–1859
UK MPs 1859–1865
UK MPs 1868–1874
UK MPs 1874–1880
UK MPs 1880–1885
19th-century British journalists
British male journalists